Gardner Inlet is a large, ice-filled inlet at the southwest side of Bowman Peninsula, on the east coast of Palmer Land, Antarctica. It was discovered by the Ronne Antarctic Research Expedition, 1947–48, under Finn Ronne, who named it for Irvine Clifton Gardner, a physicist at the National Bureau of Standards, and member of the American Antarctic Association, Inc., the organization set up to make plans and preparations for the expedition. His work in the field of optics as applied to aerial photography has been an important contribution to this technique in polar exploration.

References

Inlets of Palmer Land